The 2012 USL Premier Development League season was the 18th season of the PDL. The regular season began on 22 April with a match between the Los Angeles Misioneros and Fresno Fuego, and ended with 14 matches on 15 July 2012. The regular season was followed by a postseason tournament of conference winners which determined the league's champion, Forest City London. Thirteen teams were added to the league and 4 teams dropped, bringing the total number of teams in the league to 73 for 2012.

Changes from 2011

Name changes 
 Abbotsford Mariners rebranded as Fraser Valley Mariners
 Central Florida Kraze rebranded as Orlando City U-23 after its acquisition by USL Pro team Orlando City
 Chivas El Paso Patriots rebranded as El Paso Patriots.
 Los Angeles Blues 23 rebranded as Pali Blues
 MPS Portland Phoenix rebranded as GPS Portland Phoenix
 New Hampshire Phantoms rebranded as Seacoast United Phantoms
 Tacoma Tide rebranded as Seattle Sounders FC U-23 after its acquisition by Major League Soccer team Seattle Sounders FC.
 West Texas United Sockers rebranded as West Texas Sockers

New teams 
Thirteen new clubs joined the PDL this coming season.

Realignment 
The Nashville Metros were moved from the Southeast Division of the Southern Conference to the South Atlantic Division of the Eastern Conference.

Folding/moving 
Four teams were announced as leaving the league prior to the beginning of the season:
 Akron Summit Assault – Akron, Ohio
 Baton Rouge Capitals – Baton Rouge, Louisiana
 Indiana Invaders – South Bend, Indiana
 Rio Grande Valley Grandes – McAllen, Texas

Standings
2012 Premier Development League standings.

Note: The first tie-breaker in PDL standings is head-to-head results between teams tied on points, which is why some teams with inferior goal differences finish ahead in the standings.

Central Conference

Great Lakes Division

Heartland Division

Eastern Conference

Mid Atlantic Division

Northeast Division

South Atlantic Division

Southern Conference

Mid South Division

Southeast Division

Western Conference

Northwest Division

Southwest Division

Conference Championships
As in prior years, each of the four conferences will hold a conference championship. In 2012, the location for each conference championship will be held the weekend of 20–22 July with the host team decided by a bidding process with preference given to the teams with the best records. The winner of the four conference championships will then compete in the PDL Championship held 27–29 July and 4 August.

Divisional Playoffs
Five of the divisions have additional matches in order for teams to qualify for the conference championship.

In the Great Lakes Division the 2nd and 3rd place teams qualify for a play in match; however, the 3rd place River City Rovers ceded the match to Forest City London who qualified for the Central Conference Championship.

In the Northwest Division, the top 4 teams qualify for a play-in match with the #4 seed playing at the home pitch of the top seed; and the #3 seed playing at the #2 seed. The winners of these matches then qualify for the Western Conference Championships. These matches were played on 7/14 and 7/15 with Seattle Sounders and Portland Timbers U-23 teams winning.

In the Eastern Conference, there are three divisions. The team with the best overall record in the conference qualifies for the Conference Championships directly, and, from that team's division, the 2nd and 3rd place teams compete in a play-in match. In 2012, Ocean City from the Mid Atlantic Division had the best overall all record. Therefore, 3rd place Jersey Expressed traveled to 2nd place Reading United on 17 July to determine the 2nd team from the Mid Atlantic that would qualify for the Conference Championships. Reading United won the match 3–1 with an extra time goal scored in the 119th minute and a penalty goal in stoppage time.

The top two teams from the other two divisions will also compete in a play-in match. In the Northeast Division, the Ottawa Fury hosted the GPS Portland Phoenix on 17 July with Ottawa claiming victory after extra time 3–2. The Carolina Dynamo hosted the Real Maryland Monarchs in the South Atlantic play-in match, with Carolina easily cruising to a 5–0 victory. The Eastern Conference Championships which will be hosted by Carolina Dynamo.

Eastern Conference Championship

Central Conference Championship

Southern Conference Championship

Western Conference Championship

Bracket

PDL Championship 
The 2012 PDL Championship will consist of 4 teams, the winner of each Conference Championship, with the semi-finals being held on Saturday, 28 July and the finals being played Saturday, 4 August. The host sites were determined following the completion of the Conference Championships.

Semi-finals

Championship

Awards

 Most Valuable Player: Sullivan Silva, (THU)
 Rookie of the Year: Adam Grinwis, (MIB)
 Defender of the Year: Kevin Cope, (MIB)
 Coach of the Year: Gary Parsons, (MIB)
 Goalkeeper of the Year: Adam Grinwis, (MIB)

All-League and All-Conference Teams

Eastern Conference
F: Deshorn Brown (REA) *, Alencar Junior (WOR), David Neuberth (RMD)
M: Christian Barreiro (BAL), Jason Massie (GPS), Stephen Okai (REA)
D: Patrick Boucher (CON), Marcello Castro (OTT), Greg Cochrane (REA), Sebastien Ibeagha (CAR) *
G: John McCarthy (OCN)

Central Conference
F: Jordan Ayris (LON), Sullivan Silva (THU) *, Branden Stelmak (CIN)
M: Tom Catalano (MIB) *, Bryan Ciesiulka (CHI), Jordan Green (KCB) *
D: Sicelo Buthelezi (THU), Kevin Cope (MIB) *, Lorne Donaldson (RCO), Peter Nechvatal (KCB)
G: Adam Grinwis (MIB) *

Western Conference
F: Jaime Chavez (LAM), Mark Sherrod (POR) *, Gyasi Zardes (VCF)
M: Ben Fisk (VAN), Matt Friesen (KIT) *, Frankie López (VCF)
D: James Farenhorst (VAN), Stephen Mohn (KIT), Conor Spence (TUC), DeAndre Yedlin (SEA) *
G: Elliott Mitrou (VIC)

Southern Conference
F: Karamba Janneh (OCA), Chrispin Ochieng (MIS), Kris Tyrpak (AUS)
M: Juan de Dios Ibarra-Trevino (AUS), Douglas dos Santos (OCA), Kekuta Manneh (AUS)
D: Taian de Souza (PAN), Oumar Diakhite (ORL), Max Gunderson (LAR) *, Zack Pope (AUS)
G: Alonso Jiménez (WTX)

* denotes All-League player

References 

2012
4